La Jourdanie is a barrage and hydroelectric power station on the River Tarn in Broquiès in Aveyron, southern France.

The barrage was built in 1932, and the station has two Kaplan turbines and two helical turbines generating .

See also

Le Pouget (power station)
Renewable energy in France

References

External links

 Hydroweb Pouget in French

Dams completed in 1932
Energy infrastructure completed in 1932
Buildings and structures in Aveyron
Hydroelectric power stations in France
Dams in France
Run-of-the-river power stations
20th-century architecture in France